The Kant Hotel in Bryant, South Dakota, which has also been known as the Bryant Hotel, was built in 1912.  It was listed on the National Register of Historic Places in 1985.

It is a two-story building with cream-colored brick walls.  It has a raised parapet with decorative granite corbelling.  Two Doric columns flank its central entranceway.

It was built by Theodore Henry Kant (1856-1931), who was born in Poznan, Germany and immigrated to the U.S. in 1881.

References

Commercial buildings on the National Register of Historic Places in South Dakota
Commercial buildings completed in 1912
Hamlin County, South Dakota
Hotels in South Dakota